Layla Claire (born 1982) is a Canadian soprano opera singer. She was born in Penticton, British Columbia.  She is a graduate of the Lindemann Young Artist at the Metropolitan Opera, where she made her debut as Tebaldo in Verdi's Don Carlos in 2010. She studied at Université de Montréal and graduated from the Curtis Institute of Music in 2009.
She was awarded the Prix des Amis d'Aix-en-Provence for best Mozart performance for her 2012 European debut as Sandrina ('La finta giardiniera) and has since made acclaimed debuts at the Salzburg Festival as Donna Elvira (Don Giovanni), Opernhaus Zürich as the Governess (The Turn of the Screw), Washington National Opera as Blanche de la Force (Dialogues des Carmélites), Canadian Opera Company as Fiordiligi (Cosi fan tutte), Glyndebourne Festival Opera as Donna Anna (Don Giovanni), Händel-Festspiele Karlsruhe as Tusnelda (Arminio), and returned to the stage of the Metropolitan Opera as Anne Truelove (The Rake's Progress). Ms. Claire has worked with major conductors including Tilson-Thomas, Nézet-Séguin, Haitink, Langrée and Hrůša in works by Mahler, Beethoven, Haydn, Mozart and Dvořák.

Operatic Repertoire
Layla Claire's repertoire includes:

 Countess, The Marriage of Figaro (Mozart) 
 Pamina, Die Zauberflöte (Mozart) 
 Sandrina, La finta giardiniera(Mozart) 
 Fiordiligi, Così fan tutte (Mozart) 
 Donna Anna, Donna Elvira, Don Giovanni (Mozart)   
 Helena, A Midsummer Night's Dream (Britten)
 Governess, The Turn of the Screw (Britten)
 Blanche, Dialogues of the Carmelites (Poulenc)
 Anne Trulove, The Rake's Progress (Stravinsky) 
 Tusnelda, Arminio (Handel)

Awards
 2010 The Hildegard Behrens Foundation Award. 
 2008 Mozart Prize at the Wilhelm Stenhammar International Music Competition 
 2008 Queen Elisabeth Competition Laureate
 2007 Britten-Pears Young Artist 
 2013 Virginia Parker Prize 
 CBC Radio-Canada Jeunes Artistes recital winner
 J. Desmarais Foundation Bursaries
 Canada Council Grant

References

External links
Layla Claire official website
Layla Claire biography at IMG Artists
Video clip: Layla Claire Rehearses with James Levine from James Levine: America's Maestro, PBS, May 2011
"Levine leads superb young cast in a winning “Bartered Bride” at Juilliard", The Classical Review, George Loomis, February 17, 2011
"Kalmar, Grant Park forces deliver electrifying account of Dvorak Requiem", Chicago Classical Review, Lawrence A. Johnson, August 14, 2010 
"The Bartered Bride, New York", Opera Today, John Yohalem, February 22, 2011

1982 births
Living people
People from Penticton
Musicians from British Columbia
Canadian operatic sopranos
Curtis Institute of Music alumni
Université de Montréal alumni
21st-century Canadian women opera singers